Prue may refer to:

People
 Prue Acton (born 1943), Australian fashion designer.
 Prue Watt (born 1987), Australian Paralympic swimmer.
 Prue, a short form of Prudence, including a list of people with this name.
 Prue, a short form of Prunella, including a list of people with this name.
 Prue, a short form of Primrose, including a list of people with this name.
 Michael Prue (born 1948), Canadian politician.

Other uses
 Prue, Oklahoma, a town
 Prue, various gliders designed and built by Irving Prue

See also
 Pru (disambiguation)
 Proulx